The natal wrasse, Anchichoerops natalensis, is a species of wrasse native to the Indian Ocean coasts of South Africa and Mozambique. This fish is of minor importance to local commercial fisheries and is popular as a game fish. This species is the only known member of its genus.

References

Labridae
Monotypic fish genera
Fish described in 1909